is a passenger railway station located in the city of Ōme, Tokyo, Japan, operated by the East Japan Railway Company (JR East).

Lines
Higashi-Ōme Station is served by the Ōme Line, located 17.2 kilometers from the terminus of the line at Tachikawa Station.

Station layout
The station has one island platform serving two tracks, with an elevated station building. The station is staffed.

Platforms

History
The station opened on 1 October 1932. It was nationalized in 1944. It became part of the East Japan Railway Company (JR East) with the breakup of the Japanese National Railways in 1987.

Passenger statistics
In fiscal 2019, the station was used by an average of 6,493 passengers daily (boarding passengers only).

Surrounding area
 Tama River
former Ōme Kaidō highway

See also
 List of railway stations in Japan

References

External links 

 JR East Station information (JR East) 

Railway stations in Tokyo
Ōme Line
Stations of East Japan Railway Company
Railway stations in Japan opened in 1932
Ōme, Tokyo